Natasha Bertrand (born May 12, 1992) is an American journalist who is a White House reporter for CNN covering national security.

Early life and career 
Bertrand attended Vassar College and the London School of Economics, where she double-majored in political science and philosophy and graduated in 2014.

Bertrand began her career at Business Insider as an intern in 2014 before being appointed as a political correspondent mainly covering US foreign policy and national security. During her time at Business Insider she also reported on the Steele dossier. American journalist Erik Wemple criticised Bertrand and wrote that she gave undue credibility to the dossier.

She joined The Atlantic as a staff writer in February 2018; shortly thereafter, was named a political analyst for NBC News and MSNBC.

Bertrand became a national security correspondent for Politico in 2019. She was among the writers covering the US intelligence community and the impeachment inquiry against Donald Trump.

Bertrand joined CNN as a White House reporter covering national security in April 2021.

She was named to Forbes 30 Under 30 list in December, 2020.

References

External links 
 Natasha Bertrand on Twitter
 

1992 births
Living people
American women journalists
American political journalists
Politico people
MSNBC people
NBC News people
The Atlantic (magazine) people
Vassar College alumni
Alumni of the London School of Economics
CNN people